Charles Bowdler (1785 – 24 September 1879) was an English first-class cricketer associated with Surrey who was active in the 1800s. He is recorded in one match in 1809, totalling nine runs with a highest score of seven.

References

English cricketers
English cricketers of 1787 to 1825
Surrey cricketers
1785 births
1879 deaths